Brandian Ross (born September 28, 1989) is a scout for the Green Bay Packers. Previously he was an American football free safety. He was originally signed by the Green Bay Packers as an undrafted free agent in 2011, and by the Oakland Raiders in 2012.

College career
Ross played at the collegiate level at Youngstown State University.
He played safety his first three seasons before he switched to cornerback. Ross recorded in 45 games played (33 starts), had 223 total tackles (135 solos and 88 assists), had seven interceptions, three fumble recoveries and two forced fumbles.

Professional career

Green Bay Packers
Ross signed with the Green Bay Packers in July 2011 as an undrafted rookie and spent that season on practice squad. Ross wound up again on Green Bay's practice squad in 2012 season after the Packers waived him at the end of training camp. When Reggie McKenzie offered him a spot on the Oakland Raiders 53-man roster on September 19, Ross didn't hesitate to sign.

Oakland Raiders
On September 19, 2012, Ross was signed by the Oakland Raiders.

Miami Dolphins
On August 31, 2014, Ross was claimed off waivers by the Miami Dolphins. He was waived on September 23, 2014.

Oakland Raiders (second stint)
Ross was claimed off waivers by the Oakland Raiders from the Miami Dolphins on September 24, 2014. On December 7 on the first play against the 49ers he intercepted Colin Kaepernick for his first interception of his career.

On September 5, 2015, the Raiders placed Ross on injured reserve.

San Diego Chargers
Ross signed with the San Diego Chargers on December 30, 2015.

Denver Broncos
On April 18, 2016, Ross signed a one-year contract with the Denver Broncos. He was released on August 29, 2016.

Philanthropy 

In 2013, Ross launched the clothing line Unity Over Self to help raise money for children with autism with Everette Taylor.

References

External links
 Oakland Raiders bio
 Youngstown State Penguins bio

1989 births
Living people
American football cornerbacks
American football safeties
Green Bay Packers players
Oakland Raiders players
Miami Dolphins players
Players of American football from Richmond, Virginia
Youngstown State Penguins football players